Vít Fousek Sr. (31 December 1913 – 1990) was a Czech cross-country skier. He competed in the men's 18 kilometre event at the 1948 Winter Olympics.

References

External links
 

1913 births
1990 deaths
Czech male cross-country skiers
Olympic cross-country skiers of Czechoslovakia
Cross-country skiers at the 1948 Winter Olympics
People from Nové Město na Moravě
Sportspeople from the Vysočina Region